No 91 (Nigeria) Squadron was a squadron of the Royal Air Force but is no longer operational. The name acknowledges the contribution made by Nigeria to the cost of the squadron's aeroplanes.

World War I

A 91 squadron was initially formed in September 1917 at RAF Spitalgate but had moved to Chattis Hill within the month to undertake Wireless Telegraphy training. The squadron number was then reallocated in July 1918 to a fighter squadron being formed at RAF Kenley. The new squadron was intended to be equipped with Sopwith Dolphins but never became operational in time and was moved to Lopscombe Corner and disbanded in July 1919.

World War II

In January 1941 the squadron was reformed from No. 421 (Reconnaissance) Flight and based at RAF Hawkinge, Kent equipped with Spitfires, carrying out weather reconnaissance and Air Sea Rescue operations. In April 1943 they were upgraded to Spitfire XIIs, the first Griffon engined Spitfires, which proved very successful in intercepting the low-flying Focke-Wulf 190s. They also flew reconnaissance missions over northern France and later concentrated on bomber escort duties. In March 1944 the squadron was assigned to the Second Tactical Air Force and flew tactical sweeps over the Normandy landing zones. Later in the year, now based at RAF West Malling, Kent and equipped with the faster Spitfire XIVs they were deployed to combat the V-1 flying-bomb attacks (Capitaine Jean Maridor was blown up in mid-air when he got in too close to shoot a V-1 down ). In April 1945 the squadron relocated to East Anglia to carry out reconnaissance missions and searches for midget submarines off the coast of the Netherlands and Belgium.

Post-war

After the war the Squadron moved to RAF Duxford and in October 1946 converted to Gloster Meteors. It was renumbered 92 Squadron in January 1947.

See also
 List of RAF squadrons
 No.11 Group RAF

References

External links

 RAF Squadron Histories
 RAFWeb Air of Authority

091 Squadron
091 Squadron
Military units and formations established in 1917
1917 establishments in the United Kingdom